In These Silent Days is the seventh studio album by American singer-songwriter Brandi Carlile, released via Low Country Sound/Elektra Records on October 1, 2021. The album received critical acclaim, and the lead single "Right on Time" garnered Carlile three Grammy Award nominations in 2022, including Record of the Year and Song of the Year. The album earned Carlile seven more Grammy nominations in 2023, including Album of the Year and Best Americana Album (winning the latter), while the single "You and Me on the Rock" earned three nominations, including Record of the Year, and "Broken Horses" earned two nominations: Best Rock Performance and Best Rock Song (winning both).

The album debuted at No. 11 on the Billboard 200 and topped the Top Rock Albums and Americana/Folk Albums charts.

Production
Carlile wrote the album's songs while quarantining during the early days of the COVID-19 pandemic. She penned "Throwing Good After Bad" before any of the other tracks. She wrote "You and Me on the Rock" for her wife. The album was produced by Dave Cobb and Shooter Jennings and was recorded at RCA Studio A in fall 2020.

Critical reception

Upon release, In These Silent Days received critical acclaim from critics. At Metacritic, which assigns a normalized rating out of 100 to reviews from mainstream critics, the album has an average score of 87 out of 100 out of eleven reviews, which indicates "universal acclaim".

Reviewing the album for AllMusic, Stephen Thomas Erlewine wrote that "What separates In These Silent Days from the rest of Carlile's albums is its controlled urgency and tight sense of craft, an aesthetic evident in how the album is as lean and robust as a well-loved record from the '70s." Writing for American Songwriter, Lee Zimmerman called the album "a crowning affair, one that’s destined to be considered a high point in Carlile’s ever-expansive career." and stated that "It’s little wonder then that In These Silent Days consistently speaks volumes." Concluding the review for Entertainment Weekly, Marc Hirsh claimed that "Seven albums in, Carlile has long since proven herself constitutionally incapable of making a bad record. She's not about to start now."

Concluding the review for Paste, Ben Salmon declared that "With her talent and charisma, and this group around her, it’s no wonder Carlile is the star she was always meant to be, and there’s certainly nothing about In These Silent Days that will stop her rise." The review for Uncut also highlighted the strength of Carlile's songwriting; "The songs are introspective, reflective and fretful. ... Its best moments are its quieter ones." Writing for Variety, Chris Willman stated "Carlile effortlessly glides between octaves while, somehow, still sounding completely conversational — the everyday diva we didn’t know we needed until she showed up at the door. Fans of the singer-songwriter sensibilities of the 1970s will especially find a lot to love in the rich variety of material in “In These Silent Days,” which, under the expert co-production of Dave Cobb and Shooter Jennings, certainly sounds analog-era, however it was recorded."

Accolades

Track listing

Personnel
Musicians
 Brandi Carlile – vocals (all tracks), piano (1, 3, 5), guitar (2), acoustic guitar (4, 6, 8), Wurlitzer (5), electric guitar (9), string arrangement (9), synthesizer (10)
 Dave Cobb – acoustic guitar (1, 2, 5, 6, 8, 9)
 Phil Hanseroth – bass (1–10), percussion (5), vocals (3–6, 8, 9), string arrangement (9)
 Chris Powell – drums (1–9), percussion (2, 3)
 Tim Hanseroth – electric guitar (1, 4, 6, 8, 9), acoustic guitar (2, 3, 5, 6, 8), vocals (3–6, 8, 9), twelve-string guitar (4), string arrangement (9)
 Shooter Jennings – organ (1, 2), piano (2, 4–6, 8, 9), synthesizer (3, 6, 8), keyboards (5)
 Tom Elmhirst – programming (1, 2, 4–7, 10)
 Jess Wolfe – vocals, backing vocals (2)
 Holly Laessig – backing vocals (2)
 Josh Neumann – strings (9, 10)

Technical
 Dave Cobb – production (all tracks), mixing (3, 8)
 Shooter Jennings – production (all tracks), mixing (9)
 Tom Elmhirst – mixing (1, 2, 4–7, 10)
 Pete Lyman – mastering
 Brandon Bell – engineering
 Michael Harris – vocal engineering (2)
 Nathan Yaccino – additional engineering (9)
 Sean Quackenbush – additional engineering (9)
 David Spreng – additional recording (9)
 Matt Scatchell – mixing assistance (1, 2, 4–7, 10)
 Phillip Smith – engineering assistance

Artwork
 Catherine Carlile – creative direction
 Mat Maitland – design
 Neil Krug – digital imagery

Charts

Weekly charts

Year-end charts

In the Canyon Haze

On September 28, 2022, In These Silent Days was re-issued with a bonus disc called In the Canyon Haze. The new album consists of acoustic re-recordings of the album's ten songs, followed by a cover of David Bowie's "Space Oddity". A limited edition vinyl for the album will ship on December 2, 2022. The re-recording of "You and Me on the Rock", featuring vocals from Carlile's wife Catherine, was released on September 3, 2022.

A concert film called Brandi Carlile: In the Canyon Haze — Live from Laurel Canyon was live-streamed on the same day directly to select IMAX theaters.

Track listing

References

External links
Brandi Carlile's Official Website

2021 albums
Brandi Carlile albums
Elektra Records albums
Blues albums by American artists
Grammy Award for Best Americana Album